Sérgio Vieira (4 May 1941 – 16 December 2021) was a Mozambican politician and poet. He was Director of the Department of Education and Culture at Frelimo, Governor of the Banco de Moçambique (Bank of Mozambique) and Minister of Security and of Agriculture.

Life and work
Vieira was born in Tete, Mozambique, on 4 May 1941.

At a young age, he became a political activist, and graduated in political science. During university studies, he was part of the youth opposition movement Empire Students' House. During exile in Dar-es-Salam, he headed the FRELIMO Culture and Education Department. After the independence of his country, he held the position of Governor of the Banco de Moçambique and Minister of Internal Administration.

He died on 16 December 2021, at the age of 80.

Literature
His literary works are in Portuguese. He collaborated with some newspapers and magazines such as Jornal de Angola (Angola Newspaper) and is also included in many anthologies of poetry. His main model is Marcelinos dos Santos.

References

1941 births
2021 deaths
20th-century Mozambican politicians
21st-century Mozambican politicians
Mozambican poets
People from Tete Province
Government ministers of Mozambique
FRELIMO politicians